Virana (also known as Veerana) is a village in the district of Jalore in Rajasthan, India. It is a place with mysterious vibes.

Demographics
The Most Numerous Population of Residents Rajpurohit Caste.

Transport

Air 
The nearest airport is Jodhpur Airport, about 150km away.
Jodhpur Airport (IATA: JDH, ICAO: VIJO)
There are direct flights to Mumbai, Ahemadabad, Delhi, Indore and Jaipur.
The second-nearest airport is Sardar Vallabhbhai Patel International Airport, about 315km from Virana. It has flights to Mumbai, Hubballi, Bangalore, Chennai and Hyderabad,
These are destinations from Sardar Vallabhbhai Patel International Airport:

Bus 
Direct Bus to Various Destination like Sayala, Jalore, Bhinmal, Raniwara, Sanchore, Mehasana, Ahmedabad, Etc....

Connectivity from Jalore is very Good for Citizens  SRS Ac Volvo Multiaxle Bus from Jalore to Bangalore Via Hubli Trip Every Day Between two Destinations.

Train 
Nearest Railway Station From Virana is Jalore Railway Station is about 35 KM

Jalore Railway Station is on the Bhinmal-Jalore rail route. Passenger trains connecting Palanpur and Samdari pass through this station.

Second Nearest Railway Station From Virana is Falna Railway Station is about 105 KM

Patrol Pump 
Virana Have Its Own Petrol Pump Situated On Jalor Road, Company Indian Oil 1.5 Km From Town

References

Cities and towns in Jalore district